Events from the year 2003 in Russia.

Incumbents
 President - Vladimir Putin
 Prime Minister - Mikhail Kasyanov

Events

March
 23 March - A referendum in the break-away republic of Chechnya approves a new constitution.

April
 17 April - Assassination of Sergei Yushenkov, co-chairman of the Liberal Russia party and critic of President Vladimir Putin.
 29 April - Prime Minister of the United Kingdom Tony Blair holds a one-day summit with President Putin. Putin mocks Britain's and America's failure to locate weapons of mass destruction in Iraq.

May
 12 May - 2003 Znamenskoye suicide bombing: Three suicide bombers drive a truck bomb into the FSB directorate complex in Znamenskoye, Chechen Republic killing at least 59 people.

July
 2 July - 36-year-old billionaire oil baron Roman Abramovich buys the English football club Chelsea for £140million.

October
 25 October - Arrest of Mikhail Khodorkovsky, chairman of the YUKOS oil company, on charges of fraud.
 27 October–30 October - The stock market falls by 16.5% as the arrest of Mikhail Khodorkovsky is seen as politically motivated leading to a loss in business confidence.

December
 7 December - President Putin's United Russia party wins the largest number of seats in the legislative election.
 31 December - the end of the birth of the Russian Millennium generation

Notable births
23 January – Apollinariia Panfilova, pair skater
7 March – Polina Kostiukovich, Russian pair skater 
30 April – Misha Smirnov, singer, producer-songwriter
4 July – Polina Bogusevich, singer

Notable deaths

January

 18 January - Boris Struminsky, 63, Russian and Ukrainian physicist.
 26 January - 
 Valeriy Brumel, 60, Soviet high jumper (men's Olympic high jump medals: 1960 silver, 1964 gold).
 Vladimir Mulyavin, 62, Belarusian and Russian rock musician, complications after car accident.

April

 17 April - Sergei Yushenkov, politician (born 1950)

May

 28 May - Ilya Prigogine, Russian-born physicist and chemist, recipient of the Nobel Prize in Chemistry (born 1917)

July

 5 July - Roman Lyashenko, hockey player (born 1979)

September

 23 September - Yuri Senkevich, TV anchorman (born 1937)

See also
List of Russian films of 2003

References

External links

 
Years of the 21st century in Russia
2000s in Russia
Russia
Russia
Russia